Las Ranas (Spanish las ranas, "the frogs") may refer to:

Las Ranas Hill in Red Hill, California
Rancho Cienega de las Ranas, California
Las Ranas, site of a fortification at the Tula Mesoamerican site in Mexico
 Las Ranas, population center and site of a ball court in Querétaro, Mexico
 City of Las Ranas in the municipality of Puruándiro, Michoacán, Mexico.

Fuente de las Ranas (Albacete)
Plaza de Las Ranas in Las Palmas, Gran Canaria